Scandal in the Family is a 1967 Argentine comedy film directed by Julio Porter. It was entered into the 5th Moscow International Film Festival.

Cast
 Niní Marshall as Loli
 Pilar Bayona as Pili Luna (as Pili)
 Emilia Bayona as Mili Terán (as Mili)
 Ángel Garasa as Dr. Raimundo Luna
 Yaco Monti as Marcelo
 Juan Carlos Altavista as Carlos
 Vicente Rubino as TV Director
 Héctor Calcaño
 Carlos Scazziotta as Fito
 Lalo Malcolm
 Fidel Pintos as Próspero

References

External links
 

1967 films
1967 comedy films
1960s Spanish-language films
Films directed by Julio Porter
Argentine comedy films
1960s Argentine films